This is a round-up of the 1995 Sligo Intermediate Football Championship. Coolera/Strandhill won their second title in this year, after defeating near neighbours St. John's in the final, and thus returned to Senior level where they have remained since.

First round

Quarter finals

Semi-finals

Sligo Intermediate Football Championship Final

References

 Sligo Champion (Summer/Autumn 1995)

Sligo Intermediate Football Championship
Sligo Intermediate Football Championship